Sercan Sararer-Osuna (born 27 November 1989) is a professional footballer who plays as a winger. Born in Germany, he represented the Turkey national team.

Club career
Before joining the youth team of Greuther Fürth in 2000, he played at 1. FC Röthenbach. On 31 July 2011, he scored four goals in a DFB-Pokal game against amateur league team Eimsbütteler TV.

After the end of his contract with Fürth on 1 July 2013, Sararer moved to VfB Stuttgart on a free transfer. On 1 February 2013, Sararer signed a contract until June 2017 with VfB Stuttgart.

For the 2015–16 season he moved to Fortuna Düsseldorf.

International career
On 15 May 2012, he was called up to Turkey national team for the upcoming friendly matches. He debuted in Turkey national team at friendly match against Georgia and made an assist to Hamit Altıntop on 24 May 2012. Turkey won 3–1 the match. He also made assist to the first goal of Umut Bulut against Portugal at the friendly match on 2 June 2012. Turkey won the match 3–1.

Personal life
His father is Turkish and his mother is Catalans Spanish. He also holds a Spanish passport.

References

External links

1989 births
Living people
Footballers from Nuremberg
Citizens of Turkey through descent
Citizens of Spain through descent
Turkish footballers
Turkey international footballers
Turkish people of Spanish descent
Spanish people of Turkish descent
German footballers
Spanish footballers
German people of Turkish descent
German people of Spanish descent
Association football forwards
Bundesliga players
2. Bundesliga players
3. Liga players
Regionalliga players
SpVgg Greuther Fürth players
VfB Stuttgart players
VfB Stuttgart II players
Fortuna Düsseldorf players
Karlsruher SC players
Türkgücü München players